is a women's volleyball team based in Nishio city, Aichi, Japan. It plays in V.League 1. The club was founded in 1972.

The owner of the team is Denso.

Honours
Japan Volleyball League/V.League/V.Premier League
Runners-up (1): 2007-2008
Regular Season Champion (Premier Conference) 2019-2020
Kurowashiki All Japan Volleyball Championship
Champion (1): 2008
Empress's Cup
Champion (1): 2010
Runners-up (1): 2009
Runners-up (1): 2017

League results

Players

Current squad
2021–2022 Squad as of 04 June - 2021

Former players

Domestic players
 
 Ayako Sana (2004-2009)
 Mai Fukuda (2006-2009)
 Tomoko Okano (2000-2009)
 Junko Takahashi (2005-2009)
 Mai Uemura (2006-2009)
 Keiko Kuroha (2009-2010)
 Eri Hosoda (2003-2011)
 Masami Yokoyama (2002-2010)
 Rika Seki (2006-2010)
 Maya Ohtsuki (2006-2010)
 Furudate Ayumi (2003-2007)
 Kyoko Katashita (2008-2010)
 Sayaka Ishida (2003-2008)
 Tsubasa Honda (2008-2011)
 Shoko Ohmura (2008-2011)
 Yoshiko Yano (2004-2012)
 Yuka Sakurai (1993-2012)
 Nanami Inoue (-2013)
 Yuko Sano (2014–2015)
 Kaori Inoue (2001–2015)
 Risa Ishii (2009-2018)
 Mizuho Ishida (2015-2019)
 Nanaka Sakamoto (ja) (2014-2020)
 Yui Asahi (ja) (2016–2020)
 Asuka Nomura (2018-2020)
 Riho Ōtake (2012–2021) Transferred to Hisamitsu Springs
 Airi Tahara (ja) (2015–2021) Transferred to PFU BlueCats
 Kanami Tashiro (2019–2021)
 Kotoe Inoue (2019–2021) Transferred to NEC Red Rockets
 Mai Okumura (2019–2021)
 Yurie Nabeya (2012–2021) Transferred to PFU BlueCats

Foreign players

 Barbara Jelic (1994-1999)

 Kenia Moreta (2006-2007)
 Cindy Rondón (2007-2009)
 Lisvel Elisa Eve (2010-2011)
 Bethania de la Cruz　(2011-2012)

 Indre Sorokaite (it)
 
 Chaïne Staelens (2009-2010)

 Ivana Nešović (2012-2013)

  Sinéad Jack (2018–2020)

 Kathryn Plummer (2020–2021)

 Trần Thị Thanh Thúy (2019–2020)

 Jarasporn Bundasak (2021–2022)

Coaching staff
Head coach
 2006 - ??? : Minoru Tatsukawa
 current : Gen Kawakita

References

External links
Airybees Official Website
JVL

Japanese volleyball teams
Volleyball clubs established in 1972
Sports teams in Aichi Prefecture
1972 establishments in Japan